Calvin Davenport Venable (c. 1815 — December 27, 1862) was a Confederate field officer. Born in 1815 in Kentucky, he served as the clerk of a Henry County, Tennessee court. He was appointed the adjutant of the 5th Tennessee Infantry Regiment on May 20, 1861 and lieutenant colonel on August 8 of that year. He was wounded in action at the Battle of Perryville on October 8, 1862 and relieved of his duties later that year. Venable died in Versailles, Tennessee on December 27, 1862 of his wounds received at Perryville and of congestive fever.

References

Confederate States Army officers
1815 births
1862 deaths
Confederate States of America military personnel killed in the American Civil War